A gubernatorial election was held on 13 April 1975 to elect the Governor of Saga Prefecture.

Candidates
 - incumbent Governor of Saga Prefecture, age 73
 - former member of the House of Representatives, age 65

Results

References

Saga gubernatorial elections
1975 elections in Japan